Loubaresse may refer to the following places in France:

 Loubaresse, Ardèche, a commune in the department of Ardèche
 Loubaresse, Cantal, a commune in the department of Cantal